"Schoolboy French" is an episode of the BBC sitcom, The Green Green Grass. It was first screened on 13 October 2006, as the fifth episode of series two.

Synopsis

Tyler has a French exchange student, Lawrence, coming to stay at the farm for a week, and all the ladies of the manor are excited as Lawrence is said to be a good looking young man. However, when the student arrives, "he" turns out to be a girl called Lawrence, and then the men of the farm start to get excited. This is especially so for Tyler and Boycie, who are both being seduced by Lawrence (much to the disgust of Beth and Marlene). When Marlene sends Lawrence packing, Tyler says sorry to Beth, and asks her to marry him; she accepts, until she finds out the ring he gave her was a fake that Marlene got off someone back in the sixties.

Episode cast

References

British TV Comedy Guide for The Green Green Grass
BARB viewing figures

2006 British television episodes
The Green Green Grass episodes